John Francis Arundell, 16th Baron Arundell of Wardour JP TD (18 June 1907 – 25 September 1944) was a British soldier.

He was the only son of Gerald Arthur Arundell, 15th Baron Arundell of Wardour by his marriage to Ivy Florence Mary Segrave, daughter of Captain W. F. Segrave. He was educated at Stonyhurst College and New College, Oxford, where graduated BA. After Oxford, he became a member of the London Stock Exchange, and succeeded to the barony upon the death of his father in 1939.

Arundell served in the Territorial Army, rising to the rank of captain in the 2nd Battalion The Wiltshire Regiment. He was part of the British Expeditionary Force and in 1940, during the Battle of France, was taken prisoner-of-war by the Germans. He escaped, but was recaptured and was transferred to Oflag IV-C at Colditz Castle. There he had a habit of exercising in the snow and, perhaps as a result, contracted tuberculosis. In accordance with the Geneva Conventions, he was repatriated and died in hospital in Chester. He was buried in the Chapel of Wardour Castle. He was unmarried. The barony became extinct upon his death.

See also
List of solved missing person cases

External links 
 'ARUNDELL of Wardour', in Who Was Who, A & C Black, 1920–2008; online edn, Oxford University Press, Dec 2007 accessed 5 Jan 2011
 http://www.cwgc.org/find-war-dead/casualty/2710500

1907 births
1944 deaths
Wiltshire Regiment officers
Prisoners of war held at Colditz Castle
People educated at Stonyhurst College
Alumni of New College, Oxford
John, 16th Baron Arundell of Wardour
20th-century deaths from tuberculosis
16
British Army personnel killed in World War II
British World War II prisoners of war
World War II prisoners of war held by Germany
Tuberculosis deaths in England
British escapees
Escapees from German detention